Anthony Turgis (born 16 May 1994) is a French professional racing cyclist, who currently rides for UCI ProTeam . He was named in the startlist for the 2017 Vuelta a España. In July 2018, he was named in the start list for the Tour de France.

Personal life
His brothers Jimmy Turgis and Tanguy Turgis also competed professionally in cycling, before both had to retire due to heart conditions.

Major results

Road

2012
 1st Stage 2a (TTT) Liège–La Gleize
 UEC European Junior Championships
2nd  Road race
10th Time trial
 2nd Paris–Roubaix Juniors
2014
 1st Liège–Bastogne–Liège Espoirs
 3rd  Road race, UEC European Under-23 Championships
2015
 1st  Overall Boucles de la Mayenne
1st  Young rider classification
1st Stage 2
 3rd  Road race, UCI World Under-23 Championships
 8th Overall Arctic Race of Norway
 9th Road race, European Games
2016
 1st Classic Loire Atlantique
 3rd Overall Tour de Yorkshire
 4th Overall Tour de Luxembourg
1st Stage 3
 5th Grand Prix de Plumelec-Morbihan
2017
 3rd Paris–Chauny
 3rd Tour de l'Eurométropole
2018
 2nd Road race, National Championships
 5th Dwars door West–Vlaanderen
 5th Paris–Chauny
2019
 1st Grand Prix La Marseillaise
 1st Paris–Chauny
 2nd Dwars door Vlaanderen
 4th Overall Four Days of Dunkirk
1st  Young rider classification
 4th Overall Tour de Luxembourg
1st  Young rider classification
 4th Duo Normand (with Niki Terpstra)
 4th Famenne Ardenne Classic
 5th Circuit de Wallonie
 6th Paris–Bourges
2020
 4th Tour of Flanders
 5th Road race, National Championships
 8th Grand Prix La Marseillaise
 8th Brabantse Pijl
2021
 2nd Kuurne–Brussels–Kuurne
 5th Overall Tour Poitou-Charentes en Nouvelle-Aquitaine
 8th Dwars door Vlaanderen
 8th Tour of Flanders
 9th Gent–Wevelgem
 10th Milan–San Remo
2022
 2nd Road race, National Championships
 2nd Milan–San Remo
 3rd Polynormande
 6th Primus Classic
 8th Grand Prix of Aargau Canton
 10th Overall Boucles de la Mayenne
2023
 9th Milan–San Remo

Grand Tour general classification results timeline

Classics results timeline

Cyclo-cross

2011–2012
 UCI Junior World Cup
2nd Hoogerheide
 Junior Coupe de France
2nd Lignières-en-Berry
2nd Besançon
3rd Rodez
2013–2014
 Under-23 Coupe de France
2nd Flamanville
3rd Quelneuc

Notes

References

External links

 
 

1994 births
Living people
French male cyclists
Cyclists at the 2015 European Games
European Games competitors for France
People from Bourg-la-Reine
Sportspeople from Hauts-de-Seine
Cyclists from Île-de-France